Sixpack is a 2011 Finnish comedy film directed by Ville Jankeri.

Cast
 Jussi Nikkilä as Marsalkka
 Ylermi Rajamaa as Lihi
 Eero Milonoff as Henninen
 Marjut Maristo as Laura
 Tytti Junna as Anna
 Niilo Syväoja as Erno
 Veera Tapper as Veera
 Paavo Kinnunen as Esa

References

External links
 

2011 films
2011 comedy films
2010s Finnish-language films
Finnish comedy films